Sara López is a Colombian archer.

Sara López may also refer to:

Sara López (footballer), Spanish footballer
Sara López (sailor), Spanish sailor